Icimauna ciliaris is a species of beetle in the family Cerambycidae. It was described by Johann Christoph Friedrich Klug in 1825. It is known from Argentina, Brazil and Paraguay.

References

Hemilophini
Beetles described in 1825